Whang is a surname. Notable people with the surname include:

 Whang Bo-ryung (born 1970), South Korean-American singer, songwriter, and painter
 Ha Soo Whang (1892–1984), Korean-American social worker
 Jacqueline Whang-Peng (born 1932), Taiwanese-American physician-scientist
 Maria Whang (1865–1937), Korean-American educator and community organizer
 Nancy Whang (born 1977), American singer and musician
 Sang Whang (1931–2011), Korean-American church leader and community advocate
 Sang-Min Whang (born 1962), South Korean psychologist
 Suzanne Whang (1952–2019), American television host, comedian, radio host, author, minister, writer, producer, and political activist
 Whang Youn Dai (born 1938), South Korean physician

See also
 Huang (surname)
 Hwang (surname)
 Wang (surname)
 Wāng (surname)